This event was held on Sunday February 1, 2009 as part of the 2009 UCI Cyclo-cross World Championships in Hoogerheide, Netherlands. It was Niels Albert's first appearance in the Men's Elite World Championship and he immediately managed to get the most out of it.

Ranking

Notes

External links
 Union Cycliste Internationale

Men's elite race
UCI Cyclo-cross World Championships – Men's elite race
2009 in cyclo-cross